Pogonia is a genus of orchids (family Orchidaceae) belonging to the subfamily Vanilloideae.
<ref name=memin>[http://memim.com/pogonia-orchid.html  Memin Encyclopaedia: Pogonia] (orchid)]</ref>Chen Xinqi, Stephan W. Gale, Phillip J. Cribb: Orchidaceae ( Draft). In: Wu Zhengyi, Peter H. Raven, DY Hong (eds.): Flora of China. 25 Missouri Botanical Garden Press, St. Louis 1994.

The genus takes its name from the Greek pōgōn and pōgōníās, meaning, respectively, 'beard' and 'bearded.' 

The species of Pogonia are widespread in East Asia and eastern North America. They usually grow in open, sunny locations, often in moist to wet, sometimes flooded places.

Species
Species of the genus Pogonia'' according to Plants of the World Online

References

External links

 
Vanilloideae genera